Nachiket Dighe (born 11 November 1987) is an Indian actor and dubbing voice actor, who dubs in Hindi, Marathi, and English. He dubbed Rupert Grint's role as Ron Weasley in Hindi, in the Harry Potter film series. 

He voiced the characters Buford Van Stomm and Jeremy Johnson in the Hindi dubbed version of the animated show Phineas and Ferb and is the Hindi voice of Kenji (Tracey Sketchit) (Pokémon Chronicles) in the first Hindi dub of the Pokémon anime, and Satoshi (Ash Ketchum) in Disney's second Hindi dub of the same.

Personal life
After completing Bachelors in Engineering, Nachiket did his post-graduation with MBA in Marketing from Mumbai University. He is Sangeet Visharad in Tabla from Gandharva Mahavidyalaya and has taken training in Hindustani classical music, vocals.

Acting career

Nachiket Dighe started his acting career in sixth grade. As a child artist Nachiket acted in various advertisements and serials. His first serial Meethi Meethi Batein was a sitcom starring Sachin Pilgaonkar, Nirmiti Sawant, Niki Aneja Walia, Neha Pendse and Niyati Rajwade and aired 52 episodes for a year on DD National.

He played the character of Bipin Bukalwar in Lagi Sharth,  and Wrong Mauritius both movies of Children's Film Society, India. He played the son of Vikram Gokhale and Neena Kulkarni in the 2002 multi-starrer Marathi feature film Aadharstambha which  included prominent actors from the Marathi film industry like Dilip Prabhavalkar, Lakshmikant Berde, Sandeep Kulkarni and Atul Parchure.

Dubbing career
Nachiket Dighe started his career of voice-dubbing foreign media at the age of 11 in January 1999, by voicing cartoons, animation and live series in Hindi for various channels. He was the approved Hindi voice for T.J. Detweiler in Recess, Jimmy Neutron in The Adventures of Jimmy Neutron: Boy Genius, Tino in Disney Weekenders and Eddie in Lloyd in Space. In anime, he was the Hindi voice of Tracey Sketchit (Kenji) in the Pokémon anime of the first Hindi dub by Sound & Vision India from early 2003 until late 2013. In 2014, a second Hindi dub has been made in-house by UTV Software Communications for Hungama TV where he was hired to voice, Ash Ketchum (Satoshi) in that dub.

Filmography

Films

Television series

Animated series

Dubbing roles

Animated series

Anime

Television series

Films

Animated films

Anime films

See also
 List of Indian Dubbing Artists

References

External links
 

Male actors from Mumbai
Indian male child actors
Indian male voice actors
Male actors in Hindi cinema
Male actors in Marathi cinema
Living people
1987 births
20th-century Indian male actors
21st-century Indian male actors